St Matthew's Hospital was a mental health facility on Farewell Lane, Burntwood, Staffordshire, England.

History
The hospital, which was designed by William Lambie Moffatt in the Rundbogenstil style using a corridor layout, opened as the Second Staffordshire County Asylum in December 1864. A new dining and recreation hall were added in 1889, an extension to the female wing was added in 1897 and a corresponding extension to the male wing was added in 1898. It became Burntwood Mental Hospital in the 1920s and it saw the creation of an Emergency Medical Services hutted hospital to west of the main building during the Second World War before joining the National Health Service as St Matthew's Hospital in 1948.

After the introduction of Care in the Community in the early 1980s, the hospital went into a period of decline and closed in March 1995. Although most of the buildings were demolished, the administration building was subsequently converted into apartments and the chapel became a children's nursery. Mental health services were subsequently provided by the Burntwood Health and Wellbeing Centre.

References

Further reading

Hospitals in Staffordshire
Defunct hospitals in England
Former psychiatric hospitals in England
Hospital buildings completed in 1864
Hospitals established in 1864
1864 establishments in England
1995 disestablishments in England
Hospitals disestablished in 1995